Polaroscyphus is a genus of fungi within the Hyaloscyphaceae family. This is a monotypic genus, containing the single species Polaroscyphus spetsbergianus.

References

External links
Polaroscyphus at Index Fungorum

Hyaloscyphaceae
Monotypic Leotiomycetes genera